Alfred Griffin (31 May 1909 – 3 November 1963) was a British weightlifter. He competed in the men's lightweight event at the 1936 Summer Olympics.

References

1909 births
1963 deaths
British male weightlifters
Olympic weightlifters of Great Britain
Weightlifters at the 1936 Summer Olympics